The 2019–20 Sporting CP season was the club's 114th season in existence and 87th consecutive season in the top flight of Portuguese football. The season covered the period from 1 July 2019 to 25 July 2020.

Players

Current squad

Other players under contract

Out on loan

Transfers

In

Out

Pre-season and friendlies

On 29 April 2019, Sporting announced the first pre-season plans, including two matches in Switzerland as well as an unprecedented match against Liverpool in New York. The presentation match, against Valencia, was announced on 7 June following the announcement of a match against Club Brugge in Belgium three days earlier.

Competitions

Overview

Supertaça Cândido de Oliveira

Primeira Liga

League table

Results summary

Result round by round

Matches

Taça de Portugal

Third round

Taça da Liga

Third round

Knockout phase

UEFA Europa League

Group stage

Knockout phase

Round of 32

Statistics

Appearances and goals

|-
|colspan="16" align="center"|Goalkeepers

|-
|colspan="16" align="center"|Defenders

|-
|colspan="16" align="center"|Midfielders

|-
|colspan="16" align="center"|Forwards

|-
|colspan="16" align="center"|Players who have made an appearance this season but have left the club

References

External links

Sporting CP seasons
Sporting
Sporting